Miranda "Clarival" Oliveira is a former Brazilian soccer player who played in the NASL.

Career statistics

Club

Notes

References

Living people
Brazilian footballers
Brazilian expatriate footballers
Association football forwards
Madureira Esporte Clube players
Club Olimpia footballers
C.D. Marathón players
Kansas City Spurs players
Washington Darts players
Montreal Olympique players
North American Soccer League (1968–1984) players
Expatriate footballers in Paraguay
Brazilian expatriate sportspeople in Paraguay
Expatriate footballers in El Salvador
Brazilian expatriate sportspeople in El Salvador
Expatriate footballers in Honduras
Brazilian expatriate sportspeople in Honduras
Expatriate soccer players in the United States
Brazilian expatriate sportspeople in the United States
Expatriate soccer players in Canada
Brazilian expatriate sportspeople in Canada
Year of birth missing (living people)
Footballers from Rio de Janeiro (city)